Topka is a rural locality (a selo) in Bichursky District, Republic of Buryatia, Russia. The population was 483 in 2010. There are four streets.

Geography 
Topka is located 54 km southwest of Bichura (the district's administrative centre) by road. Okino-Klyuchi is the nearest rural locality.

References 

Rural localities in Bichursky District